Illya Marchenko was the defending champion but lost in the second round to Vincent Millot.

Jan-Lennard Struff won the title after defeating Millot 6–2, 6–0 in the final.

Seeds

Draw

Finals

Top half

Bottom half

References
Main Draw
Qualifying Draw

Ethias Trophy - Singles
2016 Ethias Trophy